Princess Louise Amelie Stephanie of Baden (5 June 1811 – 19 July 1854) was a daughter of Charles, Grand Duke of Baden, and his wife, Stéphanie de Beauharnais.

Life

Childhood 
Born on 5 June 1811 in Schwetzingen, Louise Amelie Stephanie was the eldest of five children born to Karl, Grand Duke of Baden and Stéphanie de Beauharnais. Louise Amelie had two sisters: Josephine Friederike Luise and Marie Amelie Elisabeth Caroline. Her only brother, whom was unnamed, died in infancy, although it is believed that he was Kaspar Hauser.

Louise Amelie’s parents’ marriage was unhappy, though they eventually reconciled in an effort to produce heirs to secure the throne.

Marriage 

On 9 November 1830 in Karlsruhe, Louise Amelie married her first cousin Gustav, Prince of Vasa. He was the only son of the former King of Sweden, Gustav IV Adolf, who had been overthrown in favor of his uncle Charles. Upon marriage, Prince Gustav took the title Prince of Vasa, of which made Louise Amelie the Princess of Vasa. However, some believed Prince Gustav to be the legitimate heir to the Swedish throne, henceforth dubbing Louise Amelie as the Crown Princess.[who?]

The marriage between Princess Louise Amelie and Prince Gustav was unhappy, but produced two children. Their first child, Louis, was born on 3 March 1832, but died on 7 March. A daughter, named Carola, was born on 5 August 1833. She later became Queen of Saxony. The royal couple lived in Schönbrunn Palace in Vienna until their official divorce in 1843.

Princess Louise Amalie died on 19 July 1854 in Karlsruhe. Her husband outlived her by 23 years.

Children

Ancestry

References

1811 births
1854 deaths
People from Schwetzingen
People from the Grand Duchy of Baden
House of Zähringen
Swedish princesses
Princesses of Baden
Daughters of monarchs